The Thompson Citizen is a Canadian newspaper, the longest-running newspaper in Thompson, Manitoba.

History
Originally started in 1960 by Wellington "Duke" DeCoursey who moved to Thompson from Dauphin, Manitoba, where he published the Central Manitoba News.  DeCoursey started other local newspapers, including the News of the North (in Yellowknife, Northwest Territories) and the Birch River Reporter, as well as authoring books on Canada's north and early Alberta.

The newspaper changed from being a weekly publication to printing four editions a week by 1966, before regressing back to a weekly.

Duke and Maude DeCoursey published the newspaper until 1971 when it was amalgamated with the Nickel Belt News forming Precambrian Press, which was the DeCoursey family and the Grant Wright family. Duke and Maude moved to Squamish, British Columbia, to develop a mobile home park in 1973, selling their shares in Precambrian Press. Maude died in 1993 and Duke died in 1994.

The Nickel Belt News and the Thompson Citizen are the main providers for local news in Thompson.

Grant and Joan Wright ran the operation with their kids until a few years back when Grant died. Joan left most of the operations to Carolyn Wright, who was the managing editor for a number of years.

On January 2, 2007, Precambrian Press sold the Thompson Citizen to Boundary Publishers of Estevan, Saskatchewan, which was later purchased by Glacier Media.

Donna Wilson was named the general manager of the Thompson Citizen and the Nickel Belt News in 2007 by publisher Brant Kersey. Wilson later resigned from the Thompson Citizen in 2010 to join Rogers.

On January 2, 2009, the newspaper became free to area residents.

In April 2009, the newspaper established a website to accommodate its out-of-town readers and to be able to break news as it happens.

In September 2010, Lynn Taylor joined the newspaper's staff as general manager. Taylor was previously Thompson's city manager for many years. During this time, Brant Kersey left his post as the newspaper's publisher to focus his energy on being the publisher of the Estevan Mercury in Estevan, Saskatchewan. Todd Hamilton of the Neepawa Press took over as the newspaper's publisher.

See also

 List of newspapers in Canada

External links
 , the newspaper's official website

1960 establishments in Manitoba
Glacier Media
Thompson, Manitoba
Publications established in 1960
Weekly newspapers published in Manitoba